Potassium tris(3,5-dimethyl-1-pyrazolyl)borate, abbreviated KTp*, is the potassium salt of the anion HB((CH3)2C3N2H)3. Tp*− is a tripodal ligand that binds to a metal in a facial manner, more specifically a Scorpionate ligand. KTp* is a white crystalline solid that is soluble in polar solvents, including water and several alcohols.

Synthesis
KTp* is synthesized in a manner similar to that of KTp by the reaction of potassium borohydride and 3,5-dimethylpyrazole. Hydrogen gas is evolved as each of the pyrazole reacts at the boron. The rate of B-N bond formation becomes more difficult with each successive 3,5-dimethylpyrazolyl due to the increase in steric hindrance around the boron:
3 Me2C3N2H2  +  KBH4   →    KHB(Me2C3N2H)3  +  3  H2
The required dimethylpyrazole is obtained by condensation of hydrazine and acetylacetone.

Role as ligand
The active binding sites in Tp*− are the three nitrogen centers that are not bonded to the boron. Although more weakly binding than cyclopentadienyl ligands, Tp*− is still a tightly coordinating. The benefit of Tp*− over its sister compound Tp− is the addition of the methyl groups on the pyrazolyl rings, which increases the steric hindrance of the ligand enough that only one Tp*− can bind to a metal. This leaves the remaining coordination sites available for catalysis.

References

Organoboron compounds
Tripodal ligands
Potassium compounds